DNA polymerase theta is an enzyme that in humans is encoded by the POLQ gene. This polymerase plays a key role in one of the three major double strand break repair pathways: theta-mediated end joining (TMEJ). Most double-strand breaks are repaired by non-homologous end joining (NHEJ) or homology directed repair (HDR). However, in some contexts, NHEJ and HR are insufficient and TMEJ is the only solution to repair the break. TMEJ is often described as alternative NHEJ, but differs in that it lacks a requirement for the Ku heterodimer, and it can only act on resected DNA ends. Following annealing of short (i.e., a few nucleotides) regions on the DNA overhangs, DNA polymerase theta catalyzes template-dependent DNA synthesis across the broken ends, stabilizing the paired structure.

Polymerase theta's mutational signature 
TMEJ is intrinsically mutagenic, since polymerase theta uses homologous nucleotides from both break ends to initiate repair, which leads to loss of one set of these nucleotides in the DNA sequence. Therefore, TMEJ is a form of micro-homology mediated end joining (MMEJ). Moreover, when break ends are not stabilized properly, the break ends can detach after polymerization. When these polymerized ends anneal again, a templated insert arises between the deletion junctions.

Reverse transcription of RNA 
Polθ promotes RNA-templated DNA repair. Previously, DNA polymerases were long thought to only transcribe DNA into DNA or RNA and not be able to write RNA segments into DNA.

References

Further reading